Yakir Gabay (born 1966) is a Cypriot-Israeli billionaire real estate businessman, based in London. He owns 10% of Frankfurt-listed Luxembourgish real estate company Aroundtown SA.

Gabay is the son of Meir Gabay, a former Director-General of the Israeli Ministry of Justice who also served as the Civil Service Commissioner of Israel, in addition to being elected the President of the United Nations Administrative Tribunal. Yemima Gabay, his mother, was a senior at the Israeli State Attorney's Office and Director of the Pardons Department in the State of Israel's Ministry of Justice.

Early life 
Gabay was born in Jerusalem. He completed a BS degree in economics and accounting, and an MBA degree in finance and business development at the Hebrew University.

Career 
Gabay started his career in the Prospectus Department of Israel’s SEC.

He then served in management positions in the capital market as an investment banker. In the mid-1990s, he served as CEO of the investment banking division of Bank Leumi. At the beginning of 2000, Gabay served as chairman and partner of Gmul Investments, which then managed investments for pension funds, in real estate and securities totaling $30 Billions.

In 2004, Gabay established real estate investment activity in Berlin and expanded to other large cities in Germany, UK and the Netherlands in the residential, hotel and office markets. He co-invested with private investors as well as institutional investors amongst the largest in the world mainly through the real estate companies Aroundtown and Grand City Properties. The Group's properties are located in the major cities of Germany, UK and the Netherlands.

Aroundtown SA and Grand City Properties S.A. 
In mid-2012, Gabay issued Grand City Properties SA, a residential company, at a company value of €150 million and price share of €2.7. The issue is considered most successful on the Frankfurt Stock Exchange. The company is traded on prime standard segment of the Frankfurt stock exchange, with total assets over €10 billion and at a market cap of €3.6 billion with price share of €20 (as of December 2020), and is included in the major stock indices such as MDAX.

In mid-2015, Gabay listed the shares of Aroundtown SA in both Euronext Paris and the Frankfurt Stock Exchange, at a company value of €1.5 billion and share price of €3.2. The listing was successful with more than doubling of the share price to 6.2 in December 2020 The company is traded on the prime standard segment of Frankfurt stock exchange, at a market value of €10 billion (as of December 2020) and is included in the main stock indices such as MDAX.

Aroundtown SA and Grand City Properties are both ranked by Standard & Poor's Global Ratings BBB +.

Merger with TLG 
Aroundtown which is the largest listed commercial real estate company in Germany, merged in February 2020 with TLG Immobilien AG which was traded on the Frankfurt Stock Exchange with market cap of over €3 billion. The merged company Aroundtown SA is traded on the prime standard segment of Frankfurt stock exchange, at a market value of €10 billion (as of December 2020) and is included in the main stock indices such as MDAX. As of Q3 2020 total assets of Aroundtown are over €32 billion.

Gabay held 36% of the shares of Aroundtown SA.

In September 2019 Gabay sold €1.5 worth of Aroundtown shares which reduced his holdings in Aroundtown to 10% as of December 2020. Aroundtown SA owns 40 percent of Grand City Properties, whose portfolio includes 60,000 apartments in Germany and over 3,000 in London.

Management strategy 
The strategy of the companies is based on the acquisition of real estate properties in central locations, their improvement and optimize return and creates an efficient management.

Personal life
He is married to Elena, and they live in London, England.

References

1966 births
Living people
People from Jerusalem
Jerusalem School of Business Administration alumni
21st-century Israeli businesspeople
Israeli emigrants to Cyprus
Cypriot Jews
Naturalized citizens of Cyprus
Israeli billionaires
Cypriot billionaires
Hebrew University of Jerusalem Faculty of Social Sciences alumni